DYKB (1404 AM) Radyo Ronda is a radio station owned and operated by the Radio Philippines Network. Its studios and transmitter are located at Purok KBS, Brgy. Sum-ag, Bacolod.

References

External links
Radyo Ronda Bacolod FB Page
Radyo Ronda Bacolod Website

Radio stations in Bacolod
Radio stations established in 1970